Niko Springer (born 11 July 2000) is a German darts player currently playing in Professional Darts Corporation events.

Career
Springer made his debut at just 18 years old on the PDC Development Tour 2019, where he reached the round of 64 once. He first took part in February 2021 at the PDC Qualifying School in Niedernhausen and reached the final stage.

Due to his performance in the Q School and the change in the number of participants to 24, Springer received a wildcard for the PDC Super League Darts in Niedernhausen, which will take place in April 2021. After a convincing performance by the debutant in the preliminary round, Springer was eliminated in the quarter-finals by the later tournament winner Martin Schindler.

At the PDC Development Tour 2021 (tournament 1-6) in Niedernhausen, Springer reached the semifinals and final once each. With 7th place he became the best German of the tournament.

In 2021 Springer took part in the PDC European Challenge Tour in Niedernhausen for the first time, where he was able to play in the top 16 several times and once in the final. After Steven Noster, Lukas Wenig and Ricardo Pietreczko, Niko Springer was the fourth-best German with 14th place after eight tournaments.

In the second part of the PDC Development Tour 2021 (tournament 7-12) at the beginning of November 2021, Springer reached the semi-finals and finals and thus qualified for the PDC World Youth Championship (PDC World Youth Championship 2021) on November 28, 2011 in Minehead, England and the UK Open 2022. He was also originally seeded in the final stage of the PDC Qualifying School in January 2022. However, he renounced his seeding and only took part on one day of the First Stage in order to be able to participate in later PDC tournaments.

At the first Host Nation Qualifier of the year for the European Darts Tour 2022, Springer earned a starting place at the International Darts Open, and for the German Darts Championship for the first time. 
At his debut tournament, the European Darts Tour 2022, the International Darts Open 2022, Springer made it to the top with a 6-4 win over PDC ranked number 36 Jermaine Wattimena, and a 6-5 win over PDC ranked number 23 Brendan Dolan; straight into the round of 16, in which he then lost 2-6 to reigning world champion Peter Wright.

Performance timeline

PDC European Tour

References

Living people
2000 births